The 1940–41 Connecticut Huskies men's basketball team represented University of Connecticut in the 1940–41 collegiate men's basketball season. The Huskies completed the season with a 14–2 overall record. The Huskies were members of the New England Conference, where they ended the season with a 7–1 record. The Huskies played their home games at Hawley Armory in Storrs, Connecticut, and were led by fifth-year head coach Don White.

Schedule 

|-
!colspan=12 style=""| Regular Season

Schedule Source:

References 

UConn Huskies men's basketball seasons
Connecticut
1940 in sports in Connecticut
1941 in sports in Connecticut